Esperanto Day is a worldwide observance on 26 July, which celebrates the publication of Unua Libro, the first book in the Esperanto language, by the language's creator, L. L. Zamenhof on this day in 1887. The annual multi-day World Esperanto Congress is held around this time.

See also 
Zamenhof Day

References 

Language observances
July observances
Esperanto culture